In English cricket, the years from 1751 to 1775 are notable for the rise of the Hambledon Club and the continuing spread of the sport across England. The Laws of Cricket underwent a re-codification in 1775, including the introduction of the leg before wicket rule and the addition of the third stump to the wicket.

History

1751–1775
The mid-century deaths of some of the game's leading patrons reduced investment and the sport seems to have regressed during the period of the Seven Years' War (1756–1763), but it underwent an evolutionary change around 1760 with the introduction of pitched delivery bowling and the consequent invention of the straight bat. Around the same time, the Hambledon Club was founded and cricket thrived under its leadership for the next 25 years. Cricket continued its spread throughout England with several references in 1751 followed by Derbyshire in 1757, Northumberland in 1766, and Wiltshire in 1769.

In 1769, the Whitehall Evening Post reported that a "great match at Cricket" was to be played at Calais in northern France.

Impact of the Seven Years War
The Seven Years' War (1756–1763) caused economic hardship in England. Consequently, it would seem, investment in cricket was considerably reduced. The British declaration of war against France was confirmed on 17 May 1756, although military operations had already begun. The war lasted until 10 February 1763 when Britain signed the Treaty of Paris with France and Spain. One outcome of the war was that Great Britain could expand its interests in India at the expense of France. The era of the British Raj began and, in time, ensured the spread of cricket throughout the sub-continent.

There was certainly a reduction in the number of matches recorded during the war years. There were five in 1756, all involving Dartford and including three against Hambledon – these are the earliest Hambledon matches on record. In the later years of the war, the number of eleven-a-side matches ranged from none at all in 1760 to eight in 1762. Records of only two matches have survived from the 1763 season which began soon after the war ended; a post-war recovery is discernible from 1764.

Hambledon
The origin of the Hambledon Club has not been fully established but it had certainly been founded by 1764 as three matches against Chertsey are listed that season. Based at Broadhalfpenny Down, near the village of Hambledon in rural Hampshire, it was actually a social club with a wide range of activities. It is best remembered for its organisation of county cricket matches and it ran the Hampshire county teams of the period. In August 1771, the Hambledon Club played against a team called "All England" but lost by ten wickets.

The earliest known matches involving a team called Hambledon were three against Dartford in the 1756 season. The source for one of them, played on Broadhalfpenny Down, is a newspaper advert placed by the owner of a missing dog which was lost at the match. Given the uncertainty about when the Hambledon Club was founded, it is possible that some kind of parish organisation was operating in 1756, perhaps led by a patron.

1751–1763
Following the death of the Duke of Richmond in 1750, cricket lost another key supporter when Frederick, Prince of Wales died on March 31, 1751.

There were two matches between Kent and an England XI on the Artillery Ground in May 1751. England won the first by nine runs and the second by an innings and nine runs. These seem to have been the last known big matches for many years as there is much less coverage of cricket in the sources after 1751.

The earliest references to cricket in the counties of Durham, Somerset, Warwickshire and Yorkshire all occurred in 1751. There were two matches in Yorkshire: a local game in Sheffield and one patronised by two aristocrats near Richmond.

The earliest known mentions of Hambledon and Broadhalfpenny Down are in August 1753 when Hambledon played a Surrey team and won by 113 runs.

That cricket can be a dangerous game was evident in August 1755 when a player on Kennington Common lost his right eye after being hit by the ball.

Fewer matches were played during the Seven Years' War (1756–1763). Dartford played three matches against an England XI in the 1759 season and the names of several participants are known. Dartford won two of the matches; England won one.

There was a report of a game being played in the Chapeltown area of Leeds on Thursday, 9 July 1761. This is the earliest mention of cricket in Leeds, following records of the game in Sheffield a decade earlier. Surviving records indicate that the Chertsey club in Surrey was active through the war years. Details of two Middlesex v Surrey games have survived from the 1763 season, which began shortly after the war ended.

1764–1771
The 1764 season marked the beginning of the "Hambledon Era" in earnest and it is believed to be about this time that the Hambledon Club was founded. A number of notable players are mentioned in sources for the first time, including three of the greatest 18th century players: Richard Nyren, John Small and Lumpy Stevens. Seven eleven-a-side matches between significant teams are known to have taken place. Chertsey and Hambledon, by then the leading teams in cricket, played each other three times as did teams called Norfolk and Suffolk.

Five eleven-a-side matches were recorded in 1765 including two in Yorkshire between the Leeds and Sheffield clubs. There were only three matches in 1766 but including Sussex v Hampshire, which is the earliest reference to Hampshire as an individual county team. Seven matches were recorded in 1767 including one between Hampshire and Sussex.

In 1768, the earliest references to patrons John Sackville, 3rd Duke of Dorset, and Sir Horatio Mann have been found in a cricketing context. In a game between Hampshire and Kent on Broadhalfpenny Down, Hampshire batsman John Small reportedly scored "above seven score notches" (i.e., over 140 runs), but it is not known if it was his match total or his score in Hampshire's second innings. Hampshire totalled 131 and 194 to win the match by 144 runs. A week later, Small scored more than 80 in a match against Sussex. Reports have survived of eight eleven-a-side matches in the season.

1769 was the last season in which the original London Cricket Club and the Artillery Ground feature prominently in the records. There were three matches between Kent and London that season, the first in Blackheath and the last two on the Artillery Ground. Kent won the first and third, London the second.

A partial score has survived of a game between the Duke of Dorset's XI and Wrotham, played at Sevenoaks Vine in August 1769. John Minshull (aka Minchin) scored 107 for Dorset's XI in the second innings and this is the earliest century in any class of cricket that has definitely been recorded. There were eleven recorded matches in 1769. Surrey played Berkshire, winning by six runs on Datchet Common. This is the first time Berkshire is recorded as a county team and it became a strong centre of the game in the late 18th century, producing numerous players good enough to take part in major matches. On 28 September, Hambledon defeated Surrey by an innings and 41 runs after their opening batsmen, Tom Sueter and George Leer shared a century partnership of 128 for the first wicket; this was apparently a rare occurrence at the time.

On Thursday, 29 June 1770, the Middlesex Journal reported the death of a Mr Johnson, who was a goldsmith at London Wall. His death was "occasioned by a blow which he received from a cricket ball on Thursday, 21 June near Islington". Little is known of the 1770 season but there was a county match at the Artillery Ground in August when a combined London and Middlesex team played against Surrey. In October, Hambledon played Caterham on Broadhalfpenny Down and won by 57 runs.

On 26–27 August 1771, there was a match on the Forest Racecourse, Nottingham, between the Nottingham and Sheffield clubs. Rowland Bowen, writing in the 1965 edition of Wisden, mentions the rise of cricket in the industrial cities of Leicester, Nottingham and Sheffield. Apart from London, cricket in this period was elsewhere a rural game. Bowen's view is that the trades (hose, lace and cutlery) practised in these cities provided the opportunity for contract piece work so that each man worked in his own home in his own time, outside the restrictions of the later factory system. He argues that this enabled them to play cricket during the day in summer and work at night.

1772 season

The first documented match scorecards originate from 1744, but few have been discovered prior to 1772. The scorecards for three 1772 matches have survived, and as scorecards grew more popular in the years thereafter, these three have served as the foundation for cricket's statistical record. The first match in the ESPN cricinfo database was played on 24 June 1772 between Hampshire and an England XI at Broadhalfpenny Down, near Hambledon; Hampshire won by 53 runs.

The other two games with surviving scorecards were England v Hampshire at Guildford and England v Hampshire at Bishopsbourne in Kent. Hampshire won the Guildford match by 62 runs and England won by two wickets at Bishopsbourne.

These early scorecards gave scores only with no details of dismissals or bowling. The leading runscorers in the three matches were John Small of Hampshire, who totalled 213 in six innings with a highest score of 78 in the first match, and William Yalden of England, who scored 136 in six innings with a highest of 68 at Guildford.

See also
 History of cricket (1726–1750)
 History of cricket (1776–1800)

References

Further reading
 
 
 
 
 
 
 
 
 
 
 
 
 
 

1751
1750s in sports
1760s in sports
1770s in sports